Paragonatodus is an extinct genus of prehistoric bony fish that lived during the Tournaisian stage of the Mississippian epoch.

See also

 Prehistoric fish
 List of prehistoric bony fish

References

Palaeonisciformes
Mississippian fish